Sankt Lorenzen am Wechsel is a municipality in the district of Hartberg-Fürstenfeld in Styria, Austria.

References

Prealps East of the Mur
Cities and towns in Hartberg-Fürstenfeld District